Paranerita metapyrioides is a moth of the subfamily Arctiinae. It was described by Walter Rothschild in 1916. It is found in Colombia.

References

Paranerita
Moths described in 1916